Owalini is a Marathi movie released on 26 April 2002. The movie is produced by Medhpranav Babasaheb Powar and directed by Dr. Babasaheb Powar.

Cast 

The cast includes Alka Kubal, Rajashekhar, Usha Naik, Chetan Dalvi, Alka Inamdar & Others.

Soundtrack
The music is provided by Bal Jamenish and Mahesh Hiremath.

References

External links 
  Movie Details - filmorbit.com
 Movie Album - smashits.com

2002 films
2000s Marathi-language films